Gymnothorax sokotrensis is a moray eel found in the western Indian Ocean, around Yemen. It was first named by Kotthaus in 1968.

References

sokotrensis
Fish described in 1968